Volodymyr Musolitin (born 11 March 1973 in Odessa) is a former Ukrainian footballer.

References

External links 
 
 

1973 births
Living people
Footballers from Odesa
Soviet footballers
Ukrainian footballers
Ukraine international footballers
SC Odesa players
FC Chornomorets Odesa players
FC Arsenal Kyiv players
FC CSKA Kyiv players
FC Naftovyk-Ukrnafta Okhtyrka players
FC Vorskla Poltava players
FC Vorskla-2 Poltava players
FC Metalurh Zaporizhzhia players
FC Kryvbas Kryvyi Rih players
FC Dnister Ovidiopol players
Ukrainian Premier League players
Ukrainian First League players
Ukrainian Second League players
Association football forwards